Procatopodinae is a subfamily of the family Poeciliidae, the "livebearers", in the order Cyprinodontiformes. Some authorities treat this subfamily as a family, the Procatopodidae, including the banded lampeye.

Subdivisions
The subfamily Procatopodinae is divided into two tribes and 11 genera:

 Tribe Fluviphylacini Roberts, 1970
 Fluviphylax Whitley, 1920
 Tribe Procatopodini Fowler, 1916
 Aapticheilichthys Huber, 2011
 Micropanchax Myers, 1924
 Lacustricola Myers, 1924 
 Poropanchax Clausen, 1967
 Platypanchax Ahl, 1928
 Lamprichthys Regan 1911
 Pantanodon Myers, 1955
 Hypsopanchax Myers, 1924
 Procatopus Boulenger, 1904
 Plataplochilus Ahl, 1928
 Rhexipanchax Huber, 1999

References

Poeciliidae
Taxa named by Henry Weed Fowler